"No Dream Impossible" was the  entry for the Eurovision Song Contest 2001, written by Russ Ballard and Chris Winter and performed by Lindsay Dracass.

The song was performed 16th on the night of the contest, following 's Sedat Yüce with "Sevgiliye son" and preceding 's Nuša Derenda with "Energy". The song received 28 points, placing 15th in a field of 23.

The song, which reached No. 32 on the UK Singles Chart, was succeeded as UK entry at the 2002 contest by Jessica Garlick with "Come Back".

Charts

References

2001 songs
Eurovision songs of 2001
Eurovision songs of the United Kingdom
Songs written by Russ Ballard